The Ravensburg Towerstars, also known as EV Ravensburg, are a professional ice hockey team based in Ravensburg, Germany, and one of the oldest clubs in the country. They currently play in DEL2, the second level of ice hockey in Germany.

Prior to the 2013–14 season they played in the 2nd Bundesliga. They finished the 2011 season first, becoming champions of the 2nd Bundesliga. However, as there was at the time no promotion and relegation between 2nd Bundesliga and the highest German ice hockey league, the DEL, the Ravensburg Towerstars were not promoted following their success.

Until 2007 they played in the Oberliga.

Achievements
 Oberliga champion : 1967, 2007
 2nd Bundesliga champion: 2010/11, 2018/19

References

External links
 towerstars.de – official website
 

Ice hockey teams in Germany
Ice hockey teams in Baden-Württemberg
Ravensburg
Sport in Tübingen (region)
1926 establishments in Germany
Ice hockey clubs established in 1926